"Float On" is a 1977 hit song by the R&B/soul group The Floaters.
The spoken verses combine two popular trends from the time, star signs and video and phone dating, in lines such as Aquarius and my name is Ralph / Now I like a woman who loves her freedom. The song was co-written by James Mitchell of The Detroit Emeralds group.

Released from their self-titled debut album, it became one of the biggest singles of the year, spending six weeks at number one on the U.S. Hot Soul Singles chart. "Float On" was also a crossover hit, peaking at number two on the Billboard Hot 100 behind Andy Gibb's "I Just Want to Be Your Everything" and The Emotions' "Best of My Love", but with no other Hot 100 hits, The Floaters became a one-hit wonder on that chart. "Float On" also reached number one on the UK Singles Chart, and number five on the Irish Singles Chart. 

Stetsasonic covered the song on its album In Full Gear (1988). The song was adapted in the early 1990s to advertise Cadbury's Crème Eggs. A song from Dream Warriors' 1996 album The Master Plan, also titled "Float On", sampled multiple elements of the 1977 song. Full Force released their own version in 2001.

Parodies
The track became a source of parody. Artists who recorded a spoof include:
 English comedy band The Barron Knights on their 1977 UK hit single "Live in Trouble".
 Cheech & Chong on their 1977 US hit single "Bloat On".
 The characters from Sesame Street, David (Northern Calloway), Bob (Bob McGrath), Gordon (Roscoe Orman) and Luis (Emilio Delgado) did a style parody of the song called "Gimmie Five".

Charts

See also
List of number-one R&B singles of 1977 (U.S.)

References

External links
[ Song Review] on the Allmusic website

1977 singles
Number-one singles in New Zealand
UK Singles Chart number-one singles
1977 songs